John Francis Cosgrove (July 1, 1949 – April 19, 2006) was a Florida legislator.

Cosgrove previously served as a Representative in the House of Representatives of the U.S. state of Florida. In January 2006, he was elected the first mayor of the newly incorporated town of Cutler Bay, Florida. While vacationing in Zimbabwe, Cosgrove underwent an emergency appendectomy at a medical facility in South Africa. He died on April 19, 2006.

In 2007, a portion of the Homestead Extension of Florida's Turnpike between Southwest 152nd and 216th streets in Palmetto Bay and Cutler Bay was designated by the Florida legislature as the "John F. Cosgrove Highway."

Education
Cosgrove received his bachelor's degree in journalism from the University of Florida in 1972. He received his law degree from the Cumberland School of Law in 1975.

As an undergraduate at Florida, he became a brother of Phi Kappa Tau fraternity and was later its National President and legal counsel.

References

External links
Official Website of John F. Cosgrove

University of Florida alumni
Cumberland School of Law alumni
Democratic Party members of the Florida House of Representatives
1949 births
2006 deaths
Phi Kappa Tau
20th-century American politicians
People from Coral Gables, Florida
People from Cutler Bay, Florida